Lepidosperma angustatum is a sedge of the family Cyperaceae that is native to Western Australia.

In Western Australia it is found along the coast on steep slopes as two separate populations in the Peel and Great Southern regions where it grows in sandy-clay-loam soils over or around granite.

References

Plants described in 1810
Flora of Western Australia
angustatum
Taxa named by Robert Brown (botanist, born 1773)